Billoux is a surname. Notable people with the surname include:

André Billoux (1928–1980), French politician
François Billoux (1903–1978), French politician